Sanson Ki Mala Pe (literally: On the rosary of breath) is one of the most popular songs written by Meera Bai, a 16th-century mystic poet. The verses, Sanson Ki Mala Pe Simru Main, Pi Ka Naam expresses her dedication towards Krishna. The major characteristic of her poetry is the complete submission to the deity. This bhajan is written by Meera Bai in the love of her beloved one lord Krishna. Meera Bai was a devout follower of Lord Krishna. Here pi is a word of Hindi literature that means for loving one or lover as Meerabai loved Krishna as her "Priyatam". The word pi describes Krishna in this bhajan.

In Modern times, it was popularised by the various artists as well as by legendary vocalist, Nusrat Fateh Ali Khan. It was first played by Khan during his first visit to India in 1979 when Raj Kapoor invited him at the wedding of his son Rishi Kapoor. The song remains popular in most Qawwali concerts, Music Reality Shows and devotional gatherings.

1997 Remixe

Inspirations
This song is also sung with minor modifications such as Saanson Ki Maala Pe Simrun Mai 'Shiv' ka naam.
The song was used in the 1997 Hindi film Koyla featuring Shahrukh Khan and Madhuri Dixit. It was also used in the 1996 Hindi film Jeet featuring Sunny Deol and Karishma Kapoor. This is also used in Trishna (2011 film) featuring Freida Pinto and Riz Ahmed.
In 2020, Rahat Fateh Ali Khan paid homage to his uncle Nusrat Fateh Ali Khan with an album cover of this song.
 "Sanson Ki Mala (is) a qawwali very close to my heart and this time, it has been presented as a fusion track, conceptualised by Salman Ahmed," Rahat said. "I dedicate the release to my mentor Ustad Nusrat Fateh Ali Khan and my father Ustad Farrukh Fateh Ali Khan. "

References

Qawwali songs
Indian songs
15th-century songs
1979 songs